The 2004 Letran Knights men's basketball team represented Colegio de San Juan de Letran in the 80th season of the National Collegiate Athletic Association in the Philippines. The men's basketball tournament for the school year 2004-05 began on June 26, 2004, and the host school for the season was University of Perpetual Help System DALTA.

The Knights, the Season 79 champions, finished the double round-robin eliminations at third place with 9 wins against 5 losses. The Knights, holding a twice-to-beat disadvantage in the Final Four against PCU Dolphins, won the first game thus forcing a knockout match. They were eliminated in the next game by the eventual champions Dolphins.

Roster 

 Depth chart Depth chart

Suspensions 

The NCAA Management Committee (Mancom) slapped Letran center Eric Rodriguez with a one-game suspension for an unsportsmanlike behavior during their second-round matchup against Perpetual Altas. Letran officials then filed a temporary restraining order from Manila Regional Trial Court to prevent the enforcement of suspending Rodriguez. NCAA Mancom chairman Michael Del Mundo blasted the Letran administration for questioning its judgment to suspend Rodriguez. Rodriguez did not play in their next game against the Mapua Cardinals.

Letran guard Ronjay Enrile was suspended for one game after a skirmish with San Sebastian's Leo Najorda in their final game date of the elimination round. Enrile was also sidelined after allegedly spitting on Perpetual's Noy Javier in their first round matchup. He sat out in the Final Four match against PCU Dolphins.

NCAA Season 80 games results 

Elimination games were played in a double round-robin format. All games were aired on Studio 23.

Source: ABS-CBN Pinoy Central

References 

Letran Knights basketball team seasons